Anton Mitterwurzer (1818–76) was a German opera singer, a noted baritone interpreter of the works of Gluck, Marschner, and Wagner.

Biography
Mitterwurzer was born in Sterzing, Tyrol and made his first theatrical appearance at Innsbruck. He was engaged at the age of twenty-one in Dresden and stayed there for thirty years, greatly influencing operatic methods. Mitterwurzer was at his best in Wagnerian roles like Wolfram, Telramund, and Hans Sachs.

Notes

References
 

1818 births
1876 deaths
German operatic baritones
19th-century German male opera singers
People from Sterzing